Ragne Kytölä (born 15 March 1965) is a Finnish athlete. She competed in the women's heptathlon at the 1988 Summer Olympics.

References

1965 births
Living people
Athletes (track and field) at the 1988 Summer Olympics
Finnish heptathletes
Olympic athletes of Finland
Sportspeople from Vaasa